Mature is the adjectival form of maturity, as immature is the adjectival form of immaturity, which have several meanings.

Mature or immature may also refer to:
Mature, a character from The King of Fighters series
"Mature 17+", a rating in the Entertainment Software Rating Board video game rating system
Victor Mature (1913-1999), American actor
Immature (band), an American boy band

See also
 Adult (disambiguation)
 Maturation (disambiguation)
 Maturity (disambiguation)
 Ripeness